The following are the national records in athletics in Kyrgyzstan maintained by Athletics Federation of Kyrgyz Republic.

Outdoor

Key to tables:

h = hand timing

a = aided road course

Men

Women

Indoor

Men

Women

References
General
Kyrgyzstani Outdoor Records 4 November 2020 updated
Kyrgyzstani Indoor Records 11 March 2021 updated
Specific

External links

Kyrgyzstan
Records
Athletics
Athletics